Tetrasarus lineatus is a species of beetle in the family Cerambycidae. It was described by Juan Brèthes in 1920.

References

Acanthoderini
Beetles described in 1920
Taxa named by Juan Brèthes